Carlyle Township is one of fifteen townships in Clinton County, Illinois, USA.  As of the 2010 census, its population was 3,932 and it contained 1,767 housing units.

Geography

Cities, towns, villages
 Carlyle (vast majority)

Cemeteries
The township contains these cemeteries:  Carlyle City Cemetery, Club Lake Grave Yard, Golder Grave Yard, Luebbers Grave Yard (now flooded), McAllister Grave Yard, Poor Farm Cemetery and St. Mary's Catholic Cemetery.

Major highways
  US Route 50
  Illinois Route 127

Rivers
 Kaskaskia River

Lakes
 Carlyle Lake 
 Horseshoe Lake

Landmarks
 Clinton County Fairgrounds
 Eldon Hazlet State Recreation Area
 Royal Lake Resort (northeast quarter)

Demographics

School districts
 Carlyle Community Unit School District 1

Political districts
 Illinois' 19th congressional district
 State House District 107
 State Senate District 54

References
 
 United States Census Bureau 2007 TIGER/Line Shapefiles
 United States National Atlas

External links
 City-Data.com
 Illinois State Archives

Townships in Clinton County, Illinois
Townships in Illinois